Beleh Kabud (also Romanized as Beleh Kabūd, Baleh Kabood, and Baleh Kabūd; also known as Balla Kabūd, Bālā Kabūd, and Bol Kabūd) is a village in Miyan Darband Rural District, in the Central District of Kermanshah County, Kermanshah Province, Iran. At the 2006 census, its population was 64, in 19 families.

References 

Populated places in Kermanshah County